The following is a complete list of Formula E ePrix which have been a part of the FIA Formula E Championship since its inception in 2014.

As of the 2023 Cape Town ePrix, 105 ePrix have been held.

The term ePrix is derived from the single-seater tradition of the Grand Prix, while changing the term to represent its nature of using only electric powered cars. ePrix are held almost exclusively on city centered street courses, the only exception being the Mexico City ePrix, held on the Autódromo Hermanos Rodríguez instead of the usual street course, and Berlin ePrix, which is raced in an existing space at the Berlin Tempelhof Airport, featuring wide long sweeping turns and a track made up of 100% concrete.

Active and past races
The information below is correct as of the 2023 Cape Town ePrix.

By race title

By host nation

Races by season

* denotes two or more races in the ePrix

Footnotes

References

Formula E
Formula E ePrix